Damerey is a commune in the Saône-et-Loire department in the region of Bourgogne-Franche-Comté in eastern France.

Geography
Damerey is part of the Bresse Chalonnaise. The Saône defines the northwest boundary of the commune.

Population

Notable people
Marie Guillot (9 September 1880 – 5 March 1934) was born in Damerey. She was a teacher in Saône-et-Loire and a pioneer of trade unionism in primary education.
Roger Mercier: The commune holds the original work of this man, a roadside artist who since 1984 has built a remarkable city of Hispanic inspiration with buildings and sculptures in painted concrete. At the age of 80 he continued maintenance and development of his work.

See also
Communes of the Saône-et-Loire department

References

Communes of Saône-et-Loire